Merica gigantea is a species of sea snail, a marine gastropod mollusk in the family Cancellariidae, the nutmeg snails.

Description

Distribution

References

 Lee Y.-C. & Lan T.C. (2002) Two new bathyal cancellariids (Gastropoda: Cancellariidae) from Taiwan. Memoir, Malacological Society of Taiwan 2: 21-24.

Cancellariidae
Gastropods described in 2002